Goram and Vincent (or Ghyston) are legendary giants in the folklore of the Bristol area, UK.

The legend and its variants
The legend of Goram and Vincent of Bristol belongs to the genus of myths which explain the origin of local geographical features by supernatural activity, and trade on existing place-names to do so. Such myths are often also the basis for other new names. The most widespread version of the legend relates that two local giants, Goram and Vincent – who, according to one version, were brothers – fancied the same woman, the beautiful Avona (whose name is that of the major local river, the River Avon, in Latin dress). She was open-minded about her suitors, and offered herself to whichever of them could drain the lake which supposedly once occupied the space between Bradford-on-Avon (Wiltshire) and Bristol. They chose different routes through the limestone hills for their drainage channels. Goram opted for a route through Henbury, and Vincent chose one on the south side of Clifton.

Unfortunately for Goram, he overheated while hard at work, drank a giant quantity of ale, and fell asleep in his favourite stone chair, whilst Vincent paced himself better and completed his channel. (One version depicts Goram as lazy and Vincent as keen and industrious.) The story accounts for the narrow gorge of the Hazel Brook (a tributary of the river Trym) in Henbury and the Avon Gorge through which the Avon now flows.

The legend also provides a basis for explaining the existence of other geographical features. When Goram woke up, he was distraught at losing Avona's affections. He first stamped his foot in a pit, creating The Giant's Footprint in the woods above Henbury gorge, and then drowned himself in the Severn. The two islands in the Severn estuary, Steep Holm and Flat Holm, are his head and shoulder. Goram also has his Soap-Dish, which is a short pillar capped with earth, and a pool also in the Henbury gorge.

The transmission of the legend
The oldest known version of the legend is to be found in William Camden's Britannia (1586). A variant version is given by Robert Atkyns in his History of Gloucestershire (1712, p. 188). The Camden version was reworked by the boy poet Thomas Chatterton, who attributed his verses to his alter ego, a medieval monk named Rowley.

An earlier mention of the giant Ghyston was recorded by William Worcester, who in 1480 described Ghyston Cliff (now St. Vincent's Rocks, near Clifton Observatory), and said that the hillfort above it (Clifton Down Camp) was founded "by a certain giant called Ghyst", who was "portrayed in/on the ground", presumably as a hill figure.

Names
The name Vincent for one of the giants rests on the fact that at Clifton, at the narrowest point of the Avon Gorge, there was formerly an ancient hermitage and chapel dedicated to St Vincent, at or near the present cave in the cliff-face which bears his name. Another (apparently modern) version of the story calls the Clifton giant Ghyston, which is in fact the name, of obscure origin, for the whole of the cliff-face of the Avon Gorge at least as early as the mid-fifteenth century, in the detailed description of the Bristol area by William Worcestre. The place-name was personified to produce the giant's name. Vincent's Cave is called Ghyston cave or The Giant’s Hole in an article in the July 1837 issue of Felix Farley’s Bristol Journal.

Goram's name seems to have been borrowed from Iseult’s father, the king of Ireland in early versions of the romance of Tristan and Iseult, which might suggest that the legend arose sometime after 1200. Gorm is Irish for 'blue' or 'dark-skinned'. The Christian name Vincent is first found in England in the 13th century, suggesting a fashionable cult of the saint (St Vincent the Deacon) around that time. These two factors suggest a possible 13th-century origin for the Bristol legend, but that is completely uncertain. It is not known, for example, whether the Clifton hermit was himself called Vincent and later became associated with the saint. St Vincent might also have been known in Bristol relatively early through the city's wine trade with Portugal and Spain (he was born in Huesca, lived and worked in Zaragoza, and is patron saint of Lisbon and of vintners).

Goram in modern times

Goram is commemorated in the features Goram's Chair and Footprint (some versions seem to treat these as the same thing, saying that the Chair was formed by the giant stamping his foot) and Soap-Dish in the gorge of the Hazel Brook. A pub of the early 1960s on the Lawrence Weston housing estate in west Bristol is called The Giant Goram, and from about 1954 sporadically to 1996, there was a funfair bearing Goram's name on the Blaise Castle landed estate (by then in the hands of Bristol City Council) in Henbury.

Vincent in other variants
In another version of the myth, Goram dug the Avon Gorge himself and there is no sign of Vincent in the story. Having completed the job, he carelessly fell over a barrow called Maes Knoll, on Dundry Hill south of Bristol, and plunged into the Severn estuary, as above. In yet another, Vincent and Goram shared a pickaxe as they went about their labours, and Vincent accidentally killed Goram by throwing it to him inaccurately halfway through their respective jobs. Vincent finished the Avon Gorge out of remorse and did some other major construction work like the Stanton Drew stone circles and even Stonehenge. One or the other giant is said to have created Maes Knoll hillfort and the pre-Anglo-Saxon period linear earthwork Wansdyke, south-east of Bristol, more or less accidentally with his digging tools. There are other variants.

A derived legend
The story has also been adapted to other local circumstances. The early 19th-century cleric and folklorist Rev. John Skinner collected a tale from the area that is now called Druid Stoke from a local farmer. Two giants had thrown stones at each other, one standing at Henbury, the other at St Vincent's Rocks by the Avon Gorge. The Henbury giant, called Goram or Gorm, threw a large one at his rival, but it fell short of its target; this accounts for the capstone of a formerly visible megalithic monument at Druid Stoke.

Sources of the legend and its literature
The earliest record of this cluster of stories is said to date from the 17th century. Marc Vyvyan-Jones, with help from Roland Clare and Linda Clare, wrote (on Plough Monday 1993) a mumming-style play based on the legend. This was first performed by Rag Morris at Blaise Castle, Bristol on Saturday 20 March 1993.

References

External links
(2005) Ray Thomas, "Bristol", for the basic legend
Transcript of 1837 article from Felix Farley's Bristol Journal
Lore of Druid Stoke
Poem about Goram and Blaise Castle
The Giants of Bristol Children's Book published by Clifton Observatory

English legendary characters
English giants
History of Bristol
English folklore